Sportkring Beveren, better known by its shorter name SK Beveren, is a  professional Belgian association football club from Beveren, East Flanders. The club is affiliated with the founded number 4068 and has yellow and blue as its colours. The team was founded in 1936 in Haasdonk and joined the Belgian Football Association in 1944 as FC Red Star Haasdonk. The club has changed names and locations several times in the last 20 years. In 2002 the club moved to Sint-Niklaas and changed its name to KV Red Star Waasland. From 2010 it continued to play in Beveren under the name KVRS Waasland - SK Beveren. Since July 1, 2022, the club has changed his name to Sportkring Beveren (SK Beveren).They play in the Challenger Pro League.

History
The club was founded in 1936 as Red Star and registered to an amateur football association. In 1944, they joined the Royal Belgian Football Association and started playing in the lowest provincial league of West Flanders. Red Star Haasdonk first reached national football in 2000–01, and they finished first of the series in Promotion. They also reached the 2000–01 Belgian Cup round of 32, losing to first division club Gent. After their first season in the third division, they moved to the bigger stadium of defunct club Sint-Niklase SKE, the Puyenbekestadion, changing their name to KV Red Star Waasland.

In 2003–04, they finished first in their series of the third division and promoted for the first time to the second division. In their first season at the second-highest level of football, Red Star Waasland finished 5th and qualified for the final round. The next season, they finished 4th, their best result as of 2010 but did not qualify for the final round. They reached again the round of 32 of the 2005–06 Belgian Cup, losing to neighbours KSK Beveren. In the 2007–08 Belgian Cup, Red Star Waasland reached the round of 16, their best cup result, by eliminating Lokeren. They lost to Anderlecht in the round of 16. The following season, they finished 4th again in the second division. In the summer of 2010 Red Star Waasland changed its name to Waasland-Beveren and moved to the bigger stadium of Beveren, the Freethiel Stadion.

In 2019–20 Belgian First Division A due to the virus epidemic the league was forced to shut down its competition. At the time of the shut down Waasland Beveren was in 16th position and was expected to relegate having their last game scheduled against KAA Gent. After months of confusion the league decided to close the season the way it left off with one game remaining, without Waasland Beveren having a chance to save themselves competitively from relegation. Unfairly enough the first division B finalists were allowed to play their playoff games for promotion to the First Division A despite the league shutdown. Having seen the hypocrisy, Waasland Beveren decided to take legal action for unfair use of power. The court battle lasted for many weeks and finally justice was awarded in Waasland Beveren favour to remain in First Division. The league was forced to make reforms and change the way the league operated and thus the league comprised 18 teams instead of 16 which included Waasland Beveren and the two finalists from First Division B, both K Beerschot VA ( official champions) and OH Leuven.

On 13 September 2020, it was announced that Waasland-Beveren would be taken over by American sports investment group, Bolt Football Holdings now having a 97% share in the club.

On 7 June 2022, the club announced it had come to an agreement with K.S.K. Beveren to share the identity of the former club under that name, allowing Waasland-Beveren to be renamed and use the similar name SK Beveren from 1 July 2022.

Players

Current squad

Out on loan

Club staff

Managers
 Dirk Geeraerd (2005–2006)
 Regi Van Acker (2006–2007)
 Dirk Geeraerd (1 July 2010 – 18 November 2012)
 Glen De Boeck (19 November 2012 – 29 October 2013)
 Bob Peeters (5 November 2013 – 23 May 2014)
 Ronny Van Geneugden (28 May 2014 – 30 December 2014)
 Guido Brepoels (2015)
 Stijn Vreven (2015–2016)
 Čedomir Janevski (2017)
 Philippe Clement (2017)
 Sven Vermant (2018)
 Yannick Ferrera (2018)
 Adnan Čustović (17 November 2018 – 26 August 2019)
 Arnauld Mercier (30 August 2019 – 2 March 2020)
 Nicky Hayen (4 May 2020 – 30 June 2021)
 Marc Schneider (1 July 2021 – 27 Feb 2022)
 Jordi Condom (28 Feb 2022 – present)

References

External links
 Official website

 
Association football clubs established in 1936
Football clubs in Belgium
1936 establishments in Belgium
Organisations based in Belgium with royal patronage
Belgian Pro League clubs
Beveren
Sport in East Flanders
Sint-Niklaas
Sports team relocations